Maria Illarionovna Prokhorova (July 20, 1903 – 1993) was a Russian scientist, biologist, the Head of Molotov University, the Dean of Faculty of Biology and Soil Studies at Leningrad State University; also she was the Head of A.A. Ukhtomsky Physiology Institute, a member of International Society for Neurochemistry, Doctor of Biology, and professor. Maria Prokhorova took part in the Great Patriotic War (WWII's Eastern Front) as a researcher on gas gangrene and its methods of treatment.

Biography 

In 1924, she graduated from the biological department of the Physics and Mathematics faculty of Leningrad State University. In 1934 she has completed a postgraduate course of Leningrad State University.
In the early 30s, she worked for some time at the Devyatinskaya school of the Vytegorsky county of the Lodeynopolsky district of the Leningrad region (now the Vytegorsky district of the Vologda region), doing extracurricular work (according to the testimony of Anastasia Nikitichna Shestopalova (Vershinina), supported by a photograph of Maria with a group of students of Devyatinskaya school).
From 1935 to 1937, she worked as deputy dean of the Faculty of Biology, was a senior researcher at the Physiological Institute and an assistant, and then associate professor of the Department of Biochemistry at the Faculty of Biology of Leningrad University.
In 1930, she became a member of the VKPB.
From October 2, 1937, to June 12, 1940, she was rector of Molotov (Perm) University.
Prokhorova participated in the All-Union Congresses of Physiologists and Biochemists in 1934 and 1937. In 1935 she was a delegate and speaker at the XV International Physiological Congress (Moscow, Leningrad).
From 1940 to 1941, she worked as an associate professor at the Department of Biochemistry, Faculty of Biology, Leningrad University.
From 1941 to 1942, she served as head of the Department of Biochemistry at Leningrad University in Saratov.
Since 1952, M. I. Prokhorova has been a professor of the Department of Biochemistry. From 1955 to 1958, she was Dean of the Faculty of Biology and Soil Studies of Leningrad State University and Director of the University of Physiology named after Aleksey Alekseevich Ukhtomsky.
During the World War II, Prokhorova headed the implementation of a special topic on the study of gas gangrene in order to develop ways of its therapy at Leningrad State University. During the siege of Leningrad, she was a member of the air defense group of Leningrad State University. She also conducted scientific and practical work on the basis of a neurosurgical hospital in Saratov.

Scientific achievements 

At the initiative of M. I. Prokhorova in 1961, a special laboratory of biochemistry of the nervous system was organized at Leningrad University.
M. I. Prokhorova was the first in Russia to use radioactive carbon in animal experiments, offering methods for determining "labeled" compounds in animal tissues. Her methodological approaches allowed us to obtain new fundamental data that changed the existing provisions on carbohydrate, lipid and energy metabolism of the brain.
The methodological approaches developed by her allowed us to obtain new fundamental data that changed the existing provisions on carbohydrate, lipid and energy metabolism of the brain and subsequently resulted in the creation of the School of neurochemists of Leningrad University. These works were highly appreciated by foreign scientists, and this was confirmed by her election as a member of the International Neurochemical Society.
M. I. Prokhorova has trained more than 40 candidates of Science and 6 doctors of Science in biology.

Sources

 Faculty of Biology and Soil Studies at Russian Wikipedia: Биологический факультет Санкт-Петербургского государственного университета // Википедия, свободная энциклопедия.
 Prokhorova M. I. On the assignment of the People's Commissariat of the RSFSR // Comp. A. S. Stabrovsky. - Perm: Publishing house of the Tomsk University. Perm Branch 1991. - pp. 59–64.
 Kostitsyn V. I. Prokhorova Maria Illarionovna / / Rectors of the Perm University. 1916–2006. 2nd Ed., reprint. and add. / Perm University, Perm, 2006. - pp. 124–133

References

1903 births
1993 deaths
People from Gdovsky District
People from Gdovsky Uyezd
Russian biologists
20th-century women scientists
Women biologists
Saint Petersburg State University alumni
Rectors of Perm State University
Academic staff of Perm State University
Recipients of the Order of Lenin
20th-century biologists